Unnur Ösp Stefánsdóttir is an Icelandic director, actress and screenwriter. A veteran stage actor and director, she his also known for her appearances in the TV series Trapped, The Minister and Blackport.

Personal life
Unnur is married to actor Björn Thors. Together they have four children.

Selected filmography
Marteinn (2009)
Réttur (2010)
Fangar (2017) as Brynja
Trapped (2018–2019) as Elín
The Minister (2020) as Katla
Blackport (2021) as Freydís

References

External links

1976 births
Living people
Unnur Osp Stefansdottir
Unnur Osp Stefansdottir
Unnur Osp Stefansdottir